Purnawarman Stadium is a multi-use stadium in Purwakarta, Purwakarta Regency, West Java, Indonesia. 
It is currently used mostly for football matches and is used as the home venue for Persipo Purwakarta.  The stadium holds 10,000 people.

References

Purwakarta Regency
Buildings and structures in West Java
Football venues in Indonesia
Sport in West Java